René Descartes ( or ; ; Latinized: Renatus  Cartesius; 31 March 1596 – 11 February 1650) was a French philosopher, scientist, and mathematician, widely considered a seminal figure in the emergence of modern philosophy and science. Mathematics was central to his method of inquiry, and he connected the previously separate fields of geometry and algebra into analytic geometry. Descartes spent much of his working life in the Dutch Republic, initially serving the Dutch States Army, later becoming a central intellectual of the Dutch Golden Age. Although he served a Protestant state and was later counted as a Deist by critics, Descartes was Roman Catholic.

Many elements of Descartes' philosophy have precedents in late Aristotelianism, the revived Stoicism of the 16th century, or in earlier philosophers like Augustine. In his natural philosophy, he differed from the schools on two major points: first, he rejected the splitting of corporeal substance into matter and form; second, he rejected any appeal to final ends, divine or natural, in explaining natural phenomena. In his theology, he insists on the absolute freedom of God's act of creation. Refusing to accept the authority of previous philosophers, Descartes frequently set his views apart from the philosophers who preceded him. In the opening section of the Passions of the Soul, an early modern treatise on emotions, Descartes goes so far as to assert that he will write on this topic "as if no one had written on these matters before." His best known philosophical statement is "" ("I think, therefore I am"), found in Discourse on the Method (1637; in French and Latin) and Principles of Philosophy (1644, in Latin).

Descartes has often been called the father of modern philosophy, and is largely seen as responsible for the increased attention given to epistemology in the 17th century. He laid the foundation for 17th-century continental rationalism, later advocated by Spinoza and Leibniz, and was later opposed by the empiricist school of thought consisting of Hobbes, Locke, Berkeley, and Hume. The rise of early modern rationalism—as a highly systematic school of philosophy in its own right for the first time in history—exerted an immense and profound influence on modern Western thought in general, with the birth of two influential rationalistic philosophical systems of Descartes (Cartesianism) and Spinoza (Spinozism). It was the 17th-century arch-rationalists like Descartes, Spinoza, and Leibniz who have given the "Age of Reason" its name and place in history. Leibniz, Spinoza, and Descartes were all well-versed in mathematics as well as philosophy, and Descartes and Leibniz contributed greatly to science as well.

Descartes' Meditations on First Philosophy (1641) continues to be a standard text at most university philosophy departments. Descartes' influence in mathematics is equally apparent; the Cartesian coordinate system was named after him. He is credited as the father of analytic geometry—used in the discovery of infinitesimal calculus and analysis. Descartes was also one of the key figures in the Scientific Revolution.

Life

Early life

René Descartes was born in La Haye en Touraine, Province of Touraine (now Descartes, Indre-et-Loire), France, on 31 March 1596. René Descartes was conceived about halfway through August 1595. His mother, Jeanne Brochard, died a few days after giving birth to a still-born child in May 1597. Descartes' father, Joachim, was a member of the Parlement of Brittany at Rennes. René lived with his grandmother and with his great-uncle. Although the Descartes family was Roman Catholic, the Poitou region was controlled by the Protestant Huguenots. In 1607, late because of his fragile health, he entered the Jesuit Collège Royal Henry-Le-Grand at La Flèche, where he was introduced to mathematics and physics, including Galileo's work. While there, Descartes first encountered hermetic mysticism. After graduation in 1614, he studied for two years (1615–16) at the University of Poitiers, earning a Baccalauréat and Licence in canon and civil law in 1616, in accordance with his father's wishes that he should become a lawyer. From there, he moved to Paris.

In Discourse on the Method, Descartes recalls:
I entirely abandoned the study of letters. Resolving to seek no knowledge other than that of which could be found in myself or else in the great book of the world, I spent the rest of my youth traveling, visiting courts and armies, mixing with people of diverse temperaments and ranks, gathering various experiences, testing myself in the situations which fortune offered me, and at all times reflecting upon whatever came my way to derive some profit from it.

In accordance with his ambition to become a professional military officer in 1618, Descartes joined, as a mercenary, the Protestant Dutch States Army in Breda under the command of Maurice of Nassau, and undertook a formal study of military engineering, as established by Simon Stevin. Descartes, therefore, received much encouragement in Breda to advance his knowledge of mathematics. In this way, he became acquainted with Isaac Beeckman, the principal of a Dordrecht school, for whom he wrote the Compendium of Music (written 1618, published 1650). Together, they worked on free fall, catenary, conic section, and fluid statics. Both believed that it was necessary to create a method that thoroughly linked mathematics and physics.

While in the service of the Catholic Duke Maximilian of Bavaria from 1619, Descartes was present at the Battle of the White Mountain near Prague, in November 1620.

According to Adrien Baillet, on the night of 10–11 November 1619 (St. Martin's Day), while stationed in Neuburg an der Donau, Descartes shut himself in a room with an "oven" (probably a cocklestove) to escape the cold. While within, he had three dreams, and believed that a divine spirit revealed to him a new philosophy. However, it is speculated that what Descartes considered to be his second dream was actually an episode of exploding head syndrome. Upon exiting, he had formulated analytic geometry and the idea of applying the mathematical method to philosophy. He concluded from these visions that the pursuit of science would prove to be, for him, the pursuit of true wisdom and a central part of his life's work. Descartes also saw very clearly that all truths were linked with one another, so that finding a fundamental truth and proceeding with logic would open the way to all science. Descartes discovered this basic truth quite soon: his famous "I think, therefore I am."

Career

France 
In 1620, Descartes left the army. He visited Basilica della Santa Casa in Loreto, then visited various countries before returning to France, and during the next few years, he spent time in Paris. It was there that he composed his first essay on method: Regulae ad Directionem Ingenii (Rules for the Direction of the Mind). He arrived in La Haye in 1623, selling all of his property to invest in bonds, which provided a comfortable income for the rest of his life. Descartes was present at the siege of La Rochelle by Cardinal Richelieu in 1627. In the autumn of that year, in the residence of the papal nuncio Guidi di Bagno, where he came with Mersenne and many other scholars to listen to a lecture given by the alchemist, Nicolas de Villiers, Sieur de Chandoux, on the principles of a supposed new philosophy, Cardinal Bérulle urged him to write an exposition of his new philosophy in some location beyond the reach of the Inquisition.

Netherlands 

Descartes returned to the Dutch Republic in 1628. In April 1629, he joined the University of Franeker, studying under Adriaan Metius, either living with a Catholic family or renting the Sjaerdemaslot. The next year, under the name "Poitevin", he enrolled at Leiden University, which at the time was a Protestant University. He studied both mathematics with Jacobus Golius, who confronted him with Pappus's hexagon theorem, and astronomy with Martin Hortensius. In October 1630, he had a falling-out with Beeckman, whom he accused of plagiarizing some of his ideas. In Amsterdam, he had a relationship with a servant girl, Helena Jans van der Strom, with whom he had a daughter, Francine, who was born in 1635 in Deventer. She was baptized a Protestant and died of scarlet fever at the age of 5.

Unlike many moralists of the time, Descartes did not deprecate the passions but rather defended them; he wept upon Francine's death in 1640. According to a recent biography by Jason Porterfield, "Descartes said that he did not believe that one must refrain from tears to prove oneself a man." Russell Shorto speculates that the experience of fatherhood and losing a child formed a turning point in Descartes' work, changing its focus from medicine to a quest for universal answers.

Despite frequent moves, he wrote all of his major work during his 20-plus years in the Netherlands, initiating a revolution in mathematics and philosophy. In 1633, Galileo was condemned by the Italian Inquisition, and Descartes abandoned plans to publish Treatise on the World, his work of the previous four years. Nevertheless, in 1637, he published parts of this work in three essays: "Les Météores" (The Meteors), "La Dioptrique" (Dioptrics) and La Géométrie (Geometry), preceded by an introduction, his famous Discours de la méthode (Discourse on the Method). In it, Descartes lays out four rules of thought, meant to ensure that our knowledge rests upon a firm foundation:

In La Géométrie, Descartes exploited the discoveries he made with Pierre de Fermat, having been able to do so because his paper, Introduction to Loci, was published posthumously in 1679. This later became known as Cartesian Geometry.

Descartes continued to publish works concerning both mathematics and philosophy for the rest of his life. In 1641, he published a metaphysics treatise, Meditationes de Prima Philosophia (Meditations on First Philosophy), written in Latin and thus addressed to the learned. It was followed in 1644 by Principia Philosophiae (Principles of Philosophy), a kind of synthesis of the Discourse on the Method and Meditations on First Philosophy. In 1643, Cartesian philosophy was condemned at the University of Utrecht, and Descartes was obliged to flee to the Hague, settling in Egmond-Binnen.

Between 1643 and 1649 Descartes lived with his girlfriend at Egmond-Binnen in an inn. Descartes became friendly with Anthony Studler van Zurck, lord of Bergen and participated in the design of his mansion and estate. He also met Dirck Rembrantsz van Nierop, a mathematician and surveyor. He was so impressed by Van Nierop's knowledge that he even brought him to the attention of Constantijn Huygens and Frans van Schooten.

Christia Mercer suggested that Descartes may have been influenced by Spanish author and Roman Catholic nun Teresa of Ávila, who, fifty years earlier, published The Interior Castle, concerning the role of philosophical reflection in intellectual growth.

Descartes began (through Alfonso Polloti, an Italian general in Dutch service) a six-year correspondence with Princess Elisabeth of Bohemia, devoted mainly to moral and psychological subjects. Connected with this correspondence, in 1649 he published Les Passions de l'âme (The Passions of the Soul), which he dedicated to the Princess. A French translation of Principia Philosophiae, prepared by Abbot Claude Picot, was published in 1647. This edition was also dedicated to Princess Elisabeth. In the preface to the French edition, Descartes praised true philosophy as a means to attain wisdom. He identifies four ordinary sources to reach wisdom and finally says that there is a fifth, better and more secure, consisting in the search for first causes.

Sweden

By 1649, Descartes had become one of Europe's most famous philosophers and scientists. That year, Queen Christina of Sweden invited him to her court to organize a new scientific academy and tutor her in his ideas about love. Descartes accepted, and moved to Sweden in the middle of winter. She was interested in and stimulated Descartes to publish The Passions of the Soul.

He was a guest at the house of Pierre Chanut, living on Västerlånggatan, less than 500 meters from Tre Kronor in Stockholm. There, Chanut and Descartes made observations with a Torricellian mercury barometer. Challenging Blaise Pascal, Descartes took the first set of barometric readings in Stockholm to see if atmospheric pressure could be used in forecasting the weather.

Death 

Descartes arranged to give lessons to Queen Christina after her birthday, three times a week at 5 am, in her cold and draughty castle. It soon became clear they did not like each other; she did not care for his mechanical philosophy, nor did he share her interest in Ancient Greek. By 15 January 1650, Descartes had seen Christina only four or five times. On 1 February, he contracted pneumonia and died on 11 February at Chanut.

The cause of death was pneumonia according to Chanut, but peripneumonia according to Christina's physician Johann van Wullen who was not allowed to bleed him. (The winter seems to have been mild, except for the second half of January which was harsh as described by Descartes himself; however, "this remark was probably intended to be as much Descartes' take on the intellectual climate as it was about the weather.")

E. Pies has questioned this account, based on a letter by the Doctor van Wullen; however, Descartes had refused his treatment, and more arguments against its veracity have been raised since. In a 2009 book, German philosopher Theodor Ebert argues that Descartes was poisoned by a Catholic missionary who opposed his religious views. 

As a Catholic in a Protestant nation, he was interred in a graveyard used mainly for orphans in Adolf Fredriks kyrka in Stockholm. His manuscripts came into the possession of Claude Clerselier, Chanut's brother-in-law, and "a devout Catholic who has begun the process of turning Descartes into a saint by cutting, adding and publishing his letters selectively." In 1663, the Pope placed Descartes' works on the Index of Prohibited Books. In 1666, sixteen years after his death, his remains were taken to France and buried in Saint-Étienne-du-Mont. In 1671, Louis XIV prohibited all lectures in Cartesianism. Although the National Convention in 1792 had planned to transfer his remains to the Panthéon, he was reburied in the Abbey of Saint-Germain-des-Prés in 1819, missing a finger and the skull. His skull is on display in the Musée de l'Homme in Paris.

Philosophical work

In his Discourse on the Method, he attempts to arrive at a fundamental set of principles that one can know as true without any doubt. To achieve this, he employs a method called hyperbolical/metaphysical doubt, also sometimes referred to as methodological skepticism or Cartesian doubt: he rejects any ideas that can be doubted and then re-establishes them in order to acquire a firm foundation for genuine knowledge. Descartes built his ideas from scratch which he does in The Meditations on First Philosophy. He relates this to architecture: the top soil is taken away to create a new building or structure. Descartes calls his doubt the soil and new knowledge the buildings. To Descartes, Aristotle's foundationalism is incomplete and his method of doubt enhances foundationalism.

Initially, Descartes arrives at only a single first principle that he thinks. This is expressed in the Latin phrase in the Discourse on Method "Cogito, ergo sum" (English: "I think, therefore I am").  Descartes concluded, if he doubted, then something or someone must be doing the doubting; therefore, the very fact that he doubted proved his existence. "The simple meaning of the phrase is that if one is skeptical of existence, that is in and of itself proof that he does exist." These two first principles—I think and I exist—were later confirmed by Descartes' clear and distinct perception (delineated in his Third Meditation from The Meditations): as he clearly and distinctly perceives these two principles, Descartes reasoned, ensures their indubitability.

Descartes concludes that he can be certain that he exists because he thinks. But in what form? He perceives his body through the use of the senses; however, these have previously been unreliable. So Descartes determines that the only indubitable knowledge is that he is a thinking thing. Thinking is what he does, and his power must come from his essence. Descartes defines "thought" (cogitatio) as "what happens in me such that I am immediately conscious of it, insofar as I am conscious of it". Thinking is thus every activity of a person of which the person is immediately conscious. He gave reasons for thinking that waking thoughts are distinguishable from dreams, and that one's mind cannot have been "hijacked" by an evil demon placing an illusory external world before one's senses.

In this manner, Descartes proceeds to construct a system of knowledge, discarding perception as unreliable and, instead, admitting only deduction as a method.

Mind–body dualism

Descartes, influenced by the automatons on display throughout the city of Paris, began to investigate the connection between the mind and body, and how the two interact. His main influences for dualism were theology and physics. The theory on the dualism of mind and body is Descartes' signature doctrine and permeates other theories he advanced. Known as Cartesian dualism (or mind–body dualism), his theory on the separation between the mind and the body went on to influence subsequent Western philosophies. In Meditations on First Philosophy, Descartes attempted to demonstrate the existence of God and the distinction between the human soul and the body. Humans are a union of mind and body; thus Descartes' dualism embraced the idea that mind and body are distinct but closely joined. While many contemporary readers of Descartes found the distinction between mind and body difficult to grasp, he thought it was entirely straightforward. Descartes employed the concept of modes, which are the ways in which substances exist. In Principles of Philosophy, Descartes explained, "we can clearly perceive a substance apart from the mode which we say differs from it, whereas we cannot, conversely, understand the mode apart from the substance". To perceive a mode apart from its substance requires an intellectual abstraction, which Descartes explained as follows:

The intellectual abstraction consists in my turning my thought away from one part of the contents of this richer idea the better to apply it to the other part with greater attention. Thus, when I consider a shape without thinking of the substance or the extension whose shape it is, I make a mental abstraction.

According to Descartes, two substances are really distinct when each of them can exist apart from the other. Thus, Descartes reasoned that God is distinct from humans, and the body and mind of a human are also distinct from one another. He argued that the great differences between body (an extended thing) and mind (an un-extended, immaterial thing) make the two ontologically distinct. According to Descartes' indivisibility argument, the mind is utterly indivisible: because "when I consider the mind, or myself in so far as I am merely a thinking thing, I am unable to distinguish any part within myself; I understand myself to be something quite single and complete."

Moreover, in The Meditations, Descartes discusses a piece of wax and exposes the single most characteristic doctrine of Cartesian dualism: that the universe contained two radically different kinds of substances—the mind or soul defined as thinking, and the body defined as matter and unthinking. The Aristotelian philosophy of Descartes' days held that the universe was inherently purposeful or teleological. Everything that happened, be it the motion of the stars or the growth of a tree, was supposedly explainable by a certain purpose, goal or end that worked its way out within nature. Aristotle called this the "final cause," and these final causes were indispensable for explaining the ways nature operated. Descartes' theory of dualism supports the distinction between traditional Aristotelian science and the new science of Kepler and Galileo, which denied the role of a divine power and "final causes" in its attempts to explain nature. Descartes' dualism provided the philosophical rationale for the latter by expelling the final cause from the physical universe (or res extensa) in favor of the mind (or res cogitans). Therefore, while Cartesian dualism paved the way for modern physics, it also held the door open for religious beliefs about the immortality of the soul.

Descartes' dualism of mind and matter implied a concept of human beings. A human was, according to Descartes, a composite entity of mind and body. Descartes gave priority to the mind and argued that the mind could exist without the body, but the body could not exist without the mind. In The Meditations, Descartes even argues that while the mind is a substance, the body is composed only of "accidents". But he did argue that mind and body are closely joined:

Nature also teaches me, by the sensations of pain, hunger, thirst and so on, that I am not merely present in my body as a pilot in his ship, but that I am very closely joined and, as it were, intermingled with it, so that I and the body form a unit. If this were not so, I, who am nothing but a thinking thing, would not feel pain when the body was hurt, but would perceive the damage purely by the intellect, just as a sailor perceives by sight if anything in his ship is broken.

Descartes' discussion on embodiment raised one of the most perplexing problems of his dualism philosophy: What exactly is the relationship of union between the mind and the body of a person? Therefore, Cartesian dualism set the agenda for philosophical discussion of the mind–body problem for many years after Descartes' death. Descartes was also a rationalist and believed in the power of innate ideas. Descartes argued the theory of innate knowledge and that all humans were born with knowledge through the higher power of God. It was this theory of innate knowledge that was later combated by philosopher John Locke (1632–1704), an empiricist. Empiricism holds that all knowledge is acquired through experience.

Physiology and psychology
In The Passions of the Soul, published in 1649, Descartes discussed the common contemporary belief that the human body contained animal spirits. These animal spirits were believed to be light and roaming fluids circulating rapidly around the nervous system between the brain and the muscles. These animal spirits were believed to affect the human soul, or passions of the soul. Descartes distinguished six basic passions: wonder, love, hatred, desire, joy and sadness. All of these passions, he argued, represented different combinations of the original spirit, and influenced the soul to will or want certain actions. He argued, for example, that fear is a passion that moves the soul to generate a response in the body. In line with his dualist teachings on the separation between the soul and the body, he hypothesized that some part of the brain served as a connector between the soul and the body and singled out the pineal gland as connector. Descartes argued that signals passed from the ear and the eye to the pineal gland, through animal spirits. Thus different motions in the gland cause various animal spirits. He argued that these motions in the pineal gland are based on God's will and that humans are supposed to want and like things that are useful to them. But he also argued that the animal spirits that moved around the body could distort the commands from the pineal gland, thus humans had to learn how to control their passions.

Descartes advanced a theory on automatic bodily reactions to external events, which influenced 19th-century reflex theory. He argued that external motions, such as touch and sound, reach the endings of the nerves and affect the animal spirits. For example, heat from fire affects a spot on the skin and sets in motion a chain of reactions, with the animal spirits reaching the brain through the central nervous system, and in turn, animal spirits are sent back to the muscles to move the hand away from the fire. Through this chain of reactions, the automatic reactions of the body do not require a thought process.

Above all, he was among the first scientists who believed that the soul should be subject to scientific investigation. He challenged the views of his contemporaries that the soul was divine, thus religious authorities regarded his books as dangerous. Descartes' writings went on to form the basis for theories on emotions and how cognitive evaluations were translated into affective processes. Descartes believed that the brain resembled a working machine and unlike many of his contemporaries, he believed that mathematics and mechanics could explain the most complicated processes of the mind. In the 20th century, Alan Turing advanced computer science based on mathematical biology as inspired by Descartes. His theories on reflexes also served as the foundation for advanced physiological theories, more than 200 years after his death. The physiologist Ivan Pavlov was a great admirer of Descartes.

Moral philosophy
For Descartes, ethics was a science, the highest and most perfect of them. Like the rest of the sciences, ethics had its roots in metaphysics. In this way, he argues for the existence of God, investigates the place of man in nature, formulates the theory of mind–body dualism, and defends free will. However, as he was a convinced rationalist, Descartes clearly states that reason is sufficient in the search for the goods that we should seek, and virtue consists in the correct reasoning that should guide our actions. Nevertheless, the quality of this reasoning depends on knowledge, because a well-informed mind will be more capable of making good choices, and it also depends on mental condition. For this reason, he said that a complete moral philosophy should include the study of the body. He discussed this subject in the correspondence with Princess Elisabeth of Bohemia, and as a result wrote his work The Passions of the Soul, that contains a study of the psychosomatic processes and reactions in man, with an emphasis on emotions or passions. His works about human passion and emotion would be the basis for the philosophy of his followers (see Cartesianism), and would have a lasting impact on ideas concerning what literature and art should be, specifically how it should invoke emotion.

Humans should seek the sovereign good that Descartes, following Zeno, identifies with virtue, as this produces blessedness. For Epicurus, the sovereign good was pleasure, and Descartes says that, in fact, this is not in contradiction with Zeno's teaching, because virtue produces a spiritual pleasure, that is better than bodily pleasure. Regarding Aristotle's opinion that happiness (eudaimonia) depends on both moral virtue and also on the goods of fortune such as a moderate degree of wealth, Descartes does not deny that fortunes contribute to happiness but remarks that they are in great proportion outside one's own control, whereas one's mind is under one's complete control. The moral writings of Descartes came at the last part of his life, but earlier, in his Discourse on the Method, he adopted three maxims to be able to act while he put all his ideas into doubt. This is known as his "Provisional Morals".

Religion 

In the third and fifth Meditation, Descartes offers proofs of a benevolent God (the trademark argument and the ontological argument respectively). Because God is benevolent, Descartes has faith in the account of reality his senses provide him, for God has provided him with a working mind and sensory system and does not desire to deceive him. From this supposition, however, Descartes finally establishes the possibility of acquiring knowledge about the world based on deduction and perception. Regarding epistemology, therefore, Descartes can be said to have contributed such ideas as a rigorous conception of foundationalism and the possibility that reason is the only reliable method of attaining knowledge. Descartes, however, was very much aware that experimentation was necessary to verify and validate theories.

Descartes invokes his causal adequacy principle to support his trademark argument for the existence of God, quoting Lucretius in defence: "Ex nihilo nihil fit", meaning "Nothing comes from nothing" (Lucretius). Oxford Reference summarises the argument, as follows, "that our idea of perfection is related to its perfect origin (God), just as a stamp or trademark is left in an article of workmanship by its maker." In the fifth Meditation, Descartes presents a version of the ontological argument which is founded on the possibility of thinking the "idea of a being that is supremely perfect and infinite," and suggests that "of all the ideas that are in me, the idea that I have of God is the most true, the most clear and distinct."

Descartes considered himself to be a devout Catholic, and one of the purposes of the Meditations was to defend the Catholic faith. His attempt to ground theological beliefs on reason encountered intense opposition in his time. Pascal regarded Descartes' views as a rationalist and mechanist, and accused him of deism: "I cannot forgive Descartes; in all his philosophy, Descartes did his best to dispense with God. But Descartes could not avoid prodding God to set the world in motion with a snap of his lordly fingers; after that, he had no more use for God," while a powerful contemporary, Martin Schoock, accused him of atheist beliefs, though Descartes had provided an explicit critique of atheism in his Meditations. The Catholic Church prohibited his books in 1663.

Descartes also wrote a response to external world skepticism. Through this method of skepticism, he does not doubt for the sake of doubting but to achieve concrete and reliable information. In other words, certainty. He argues that sensory perceptions come to him involuntarily, and are not willed by him. They are external to his senses, and according to Descartes, this is evidence of the existence of something outside of his mind, and thus, an external world. Descartes goes on to show that the things in the external world are material by arguing that God would not deceive him as to the ideas that are being transmitted, and that God has given him the "propensity" to believe that such ideas are caused by material things. Descartes also believes a substance is something that does not need any assistance to function or exist. Descartes further explains how only God can be a true "substance". But minds are substances, meaning they need only God for it to function. The mind is a thinking substance. The means for a thinking substance stem from ideas.

Descartes steered clear of theological questions, restricting his attention to showing that there is no incompatibility between his metaphysics and theological orthodoxy. He avoided trying to demonstrate theological dogmas metaphysically. When challenged that he had not established the immortality of the soul merely in showing that the soul and the body are distinct substances, he replied, "I do not take it upon myself to try to use the power of human reason to settle any of those matters which depend on the free will of God."

Natural science
Descartes is often regarded as the first thinker to emphasize the use of reason to develop the natural sciences. For him, philosophy was a thinking system that embodied all knowledge, as he related in a letter to a French translator:

On animals
Descartes denied that animals had reason or intelligence. He argued that animals did not lack sensations or perceptions, but these could be explained mechanistically. Whereas humans had a soul, or mind, and were able to feel pain and anxiety, animals by virtue of not having a soul could not feel pain or anxiety. If animals showed signs of distress then this was to protect the body from damage, but the innate state needed for them to suffer was absent. Although Descartes' views were not universally accepted, they became prominent in Europe and North America, allowing humans to treat animals with impunity. The view that animals were quite separate from humanity and merely machines allowed for the maltreatment of animals, and was sanctioned in law and societal norms until the middle of the 19th century. The publications of Charles Darwin would eventually erode the Cartesian view of animals. Darwin argued that the continuity between humans and other species opened the possibilities that animals did not have dissimilar properties to suffer.

Historical impact

Emancipation from Church doctrine

Descartes has often been dubbed the father of modern Western philosophy, the thinker whose approaches has profoundly changed the course of Western philosophy and set the basis for modernity. The first two of his Meditations on First Philosophy, those that formulate the famous methodic doubt, represent the portion of Descartes' writings that most influenced modern thinking. It has been argued that Descartes himself did not realize the extent of this revolutionary move. In shifting the debate from "what is true" to "of what can I be certain?", Descartes arguably shifted the authoritative guarantor of truth from God to humanity (even though Descartes himself claimed he received his visions from God)—while the traditional concept of "truth" implies an external authority, "certainty" instead relies on the judgment of the individual.

In an anthropocentric revolution, the human being is now raised to the level of a subject, an agent, an emancipated being equipped with autonomous reason. This was a revolutionary step that established the basis of modernity, the repercussions of which are still being felt: the emancipation of humanity from Christian revelational truth and Church doctrine; humanity making its own law and taking its own stand. In modernity, the guarantor of truth is not God anymore but human beings, each of whom is a "self-conscious shaper and guarantor" of their own reality. In that way, each person is turned into a reasoning adult, a subject and agent, as opposed to a child obedient to God. This change in perspective was characteristic of the shift from the Christian medieval period to the modern period, a shift that had been anticipated in other fields, and which was now being formulated in the field of philosophy by Descartes.

This anthropocentric perspective of Descartes' work, establishing human reason as autonomous, provided the basis for the Enlightenment's emancipation from God and the Church. According to Martin Heidegger, the perspective of Descartes' work also provided the basis for all subsequent anthropology. Descartes' philosophical revolution is sometimes said to have sparked modern anthropocentrism and subjectivism.

Mathematical legacy

One of Descartes' most enduring legacies was his development of Cartesian or analytic geometry, which uses algebra to describe geometry. Descartes "invented the convention of representing unknowns in equations by x, y, and z, and knowns by a, b, and c". He also "pioneered the standard notation" that uses superscripts to show the powers or exponents; for example, the 2 used in x2 to indicate x squared. He was first to assign a fundamental place for algebra in the system of knowledge, using it as a method to automate or mechanize reasoning, particularly about abstract, unknown quantities. European mathematicians had previously viewed geometry as a more fundamental form of mathematics, serving as the foundation of algebra. Algebraic rules were given geometric proofs by mathematicians such as Pacioli, Cardan, Tartaglia and Ferrari. Equations of degree higher than the third were regarded as unreal, because a three-dimensional form, such as a cube, occupied the largest dimension of reality. Descartes professed that the abstract quantity a2 could represent length as well as an area. This was in opposition to the teachings of mathematicians such as François Viète, who insisted that a second power must represent an area. Although Descartes did not pursue the subject, he preceded Gottfried Wilhelm Leibniz in envisioning a more general science of algebra or "universal mathematics," as a precursor to symbolic logic, that could encompass logical principles and methods symbolically, and mechanize general reasoning.

Descartes' work provided the basis for the calculus developed by Newton and Leibniz, who applied the infinitesimal calculus to the tangent line problem, thus permitting the evolution of that branch of modern mathematics. His rule of signs is also a commonly used method to determine the number of positive and negative roots of a polynomial.

The beginning to Descartes' interest in physics is accredited to the amateur scientist and mathematician Isaac Beeckman, who was at the forefront of a new school of thought known as mechanical philosophy. With this foundation of reasoning, Descartes formulated many of his theories on mechanical and geometric physics. Descartes discovered an early form of the law of conservation of momentum (a measure of the motion of an object), and envisioned it as pertaining to motion in a straight line, as opposed to perfect circular motion, as Galileo had envisioned it. He outlined his views on the universe in his Principles of Philosophy, where he describes his three laws of motion. (Newton's own laws of motion would later be modeled on Descartes' exposition.)

Descartes also made contributions to the field of optics. He showed by using geometric construction and the law of refraction (also known as Descartes' law, or more commonly Snell's law outside France) that the angular radius of a rainbow is 42 degrees (i.e., the angle subtended at the eye by the edge of the rainbow and the ray passing from the sun through the rainbow's centre is 42°). He also independently discovered the law of reflection, and his essay on optics was the first published mention of this law.

Influence on Newton's mathematics
Current popular opinion holds that Descartes had the most influence of anyone on the young Isaac Newton, and this is arguably one of his most important contributions. Decartes' influence extended not directly from his original French edition of La Géométrie, however, but rather from Frans van Schooten's expanded second Latin edition of the work. Newton continued Descartes' work on cubic equations, which freed the subject from fetters of the Greek perspectives. The most important concept was his very modern treatment of single variables.  Newton rejected Descartes' vortex theory of planetary motion in favor of his law of universal gravitation, and most of the second book of Newton's Principia is devoted to his counterargument.

Contemporary reception
In commercial terms, The Discourse appeared during Descartes' lifetime in a single edition of 500 copies, 200 of which were set aside for the author. Sharing a similar fate was the only French edition of The Meditations, which had not managed to sell out by the time of Descartes' death. A concomitant Latin edition of the latter was, however, eagerly sought out by Europe's scholarly community and proved a commercial success for Descartes.

Although Descartes was well known in academic circles towards the end of his life, the teaching of his works in schools was controversial. Henri de Roy (Henricus Regius, 1598–1679), Professor of Medicine at the University of Utrecht, was condemned by the Rector of the university, Gijsbert Voet (Voetius), for teaching Descartes' physics.

According to John Cottingham—whose translation of Meditations—is considered to be "authoritative", Descartes's Meditations on First Philosophy is considered to be "one of the key texts of Western philosophy". Cottingham said that the Meditations is the "most widely studied of all Descartes' writings".

According to Anthony Gottlieb, a former senior editor of The Economist, and the author of The Dream of Reason and The Dream of Enlightenment, one of the reasons Descartes and Thomas Hobbes continue to be debated in the second decade of the twenty-first century, is that they still have something to say to us that remains relevant on questions such as, "What does the advance of science entail for our understanding of ourselves and our ideas of God?" and "How is government to deal with religious diversity."

In her 2018 interview with Tyler Cowen, Agnes Callard described Descartes' thought experiment in the Meditations, where he encouraged a complete, systematic doubting of everything that you believe, to "see what you come to". She said, "What Descartes comes to is a kind of real truth that he can build upon inside of his own mind." She said that Hamlet's monologues"meditations on the nature of life and emotion"were similar to Descartes' thought experiment. Hamlet/Descartes were "apart from the world", as if they were "trapped" in their own heads. Cowen asked Callard if Descartes actually found any truths through his thought experiment or was it just "an earlier version of the contemporary argument that we're living in a simulation, where the evil demon is the simulation rather than Bayesian reasoning?" Callard agreed that this argument can be traced to Descartes, who had said that he had refuted it. She clarified that in Descartes' reasoning, you do "end up back in the mind of God"in a "universe God has created" that is the "real world"...The whole question is about being connected to reality as opposed to being a figment. If you're living in the world God created, God can create real things. So you're living in a real world."

Purported Rosicrucianism
The membership of Descartes to the Rosicrucians is debated.

The initials of his name have been linked to the R.C. acronym widely used by Rosicrucians. Furthermore, in 1619 Descartes moved to Ulm which was a well renowned international center of the Rosicrucian movement.
During his journey in Germany, he met Johannes Faulhaber who had previously expressed his personal commitment to join the brotherhood.

Descartes dedicated the work titled The Mathematical Treasure Trove of Polybius, Citizen of the World to "learned men throughout the world 
and especially to the distinguished B.R.C. (Brothers  of the Rosy Cross) in Germany". The work wasn't completed and its publication is uncertain.

Bibliography

Writings
 1618. Musicae Compendium. A treatise on music theory and the aesthetics of music, which Descartes dedicated to early collaborator Isaac Beeckman (written in 1618, first published—posthumously—in 1650).
 1626–1628. Regulae ad directionem ingenii (Rules for the Direction of the Mind). Incomplete. First published posthumously in Dutch translation in 1684 and in the original Latin at Amsterdam in 1701 (R. Des-Cartes Opuscula Posthuma Physica et Mathematica). The best critical edition, which includes the Dutch translation of 1684, is edited by Giovanni Crapulli (The Hague: Martinus Nijhoff, 1966).
 c. 1630. De solidorum elementis. Concerns the classification of Platonic solids and three-dimensional figurate numbers. Said by some scholars to prefigure Euler's polyhedral formula. Unpublished; discovered in Descartes' estate in Stockholm 1650, soaked for three days in the Seine in a shipwreck while being shipped back to Paris, copied in 1676 by Leibniz, and lost. Leibniz's copy, also lost, was rediscovered circa 1860 in Hannover.
 1630–1631. La recherche de la vérité par la lumière naturelle (The Search for Truth by Natural Light) unfinished dialogue published in 1701.
 1630–1633. Le Monde (The World) and L'Homme (Man). Descartes' first systematic presentation of his natural philosophy. Man was published posthumously in Latin translation in 1662; and The World posthumously in 1664.
 1637. Discours de la méthode (Discourse on the Method). An introduction to the Essais, which include the Dioptrique, the Météores and the Géométrie.
 1637. La Géométrie (Geometry). Descartes' major work in mathematics. There is an English translation by Michael Mahoney (New York: Dover, 1979).
 1641. Meditationes de prima philosophia (Meditations on First Philosophy), also known as Metaphysical Meditations. In Latin; a second edition, published the following year, included an additional objection and reply, and a Letter to Dinet. A French translation by the Duke of Luynes, probably done without Descartes' supervision, was published in 1647. Includes six Objections and Replies.
 1644. Principia philosophiae (Principles of Philosophy), a Latin textbook at first intended by Descartes to replace the Aristotelian textbooks then used in universities. A French translation, Principes de philosophie by Claude Picot, under the supervision of Descartes, appeared in 1647 with a letter-preface to Princess Elisabeth of Bohemia.
 1647. Notae in programma (Comments on a Certain Broadsheet). A reply to Descartes' one-time disciple Henricus Regius.
 1648. La description du corps humain (The Description of the Human Body). Published posthumously by Clerselier in 1667.
 1648. Responsiones Renati Des Cartes... (Conversation with Burman). Notes on a Q&A session between Descartes and Frans Burman on 16 April 1648. Rediscovered in 1895 and published for the first time in 1896. An annotated bilingual edition (Latin with French translation), edited by Jean-Marie Beyssade, was published in 1981 (Paris: PUF).
 1649. Les passions de l'âme (Passions of the Soul). Dedicated to Princess Elisabeth of the Palatinate.
 1657. Correspondance (three volumes: 1657, 1659, 1667). Published by Descartes' literary executor Claude Clerselier. The third edition, in 1667, was the most complete; Clerselier omitted, however, much of the material pertaining to mathematics.

In January 2010, a previously unknown letter from Descartes, dated 27 May 1641, was found by the Dutch philosopher Erik-Jan Bos when browsing through Google. Bos found the letter mentioned in a summary of autographs kept by Haverford College in Haverford, Pennsylvania. The college was unaware that the letter had never been published. This was the third letter by Descartes found in the last 25 years.

Collected editions

 Oeuvres de Descartes edited by Charles Adam and Paul Tannery, Paris: Léopold Cerf, 1897–1913, 13 volumes; new revised edition, Paris: Vrin-CNRS, 1964–1974, 11 volumes (the first 5 volumes contains the correspondence). [This edition is traditionally cited with the initials AT (for Adam and Tannery) followed by a volume number in Roman numerals; thus AT VII refers to Oeuvres de Descartes volume 7.]
 Étude du bon sens, La recherche de la vérité et autres écrits de jeunesse (1616–1631) edited by Vincent Carraud and Gilles Olivo, Paris: PUF, 2013.
 Descartes, Œuvres complètes, new edition by Jean-Marie Beyssade and Denis Kambouchner, Paris: Gallimard, published volumes:
 I: Premiers écrits. Règles pour la direction de l'esprit, 2016.
 III: Discours de la Méthode et Essais, 2009.
 VIII.1: Correspondance, 1 edited by Jean-Robert Armogathe, 2013.
 VIII.2: Correspondance, 2 edited by Jean-Robert Armogathe, 2013.
 René Descartes. Opere 1637–1649, Milano, Bompiani, 2009, pp. 2531. Edizione integrale (di prime edizioni) e traduzione italiana a fronte, a cura di G. Belgioioso con la collaborazione di I. Agostini, M. Marrone, M. Savini .
 René Descartes. Opere 1650–2009, Milano, Bompiani, 2009, pp. 1723. Edizione integrale delle opere postume e traduzione italiana a fronte, a cura di G. Belgioioso con la collaborazione di I. Agostini, M. Marrone, M. Savini .
 René Descartes. Tutte le lettere 1619–1650, Milano, Bompiani, 2009 IIa ed., pp. 3104. Nuova edizione integrale dell'epistolario cartesiano con traduzione italiana a fronte, a cura di G. Belgioioso con la collaborazione di I. Agostini, M. Marrone, F.A. Meschini, M. Savini e J.-R. Armogathe .
 René Descartes, Isaac Beeckman, Marin Mersenne. Lettere 1619–1648, Milano, Bompiani, 2015 pp. 1696. Edizione integrale con traduzione italiana a fronte, a cura di Giulia Beglioioso e Jean Robert-Armogathe .

Early editions of specific works

 Discours de la methode , 1637
 Renati Des-Cartes Principia philosophiæ , 1644
 Le monde de Mr. Descartes ou le traité de la lumiere , 1664
 Geometria , 1659
 Meditationes de prima philosophia , 1670
 Opera philosophica , 1672

Collected English translations

 1955. The Philosophical Works, E.S. Haldane and G.R.T. Ross, trans. Dover Publications. This work is traditionally cited with the initials HR (for Haldane and Ross) followed by a volume number in Roman numerals; thus HR II refers to volume 2 of this edition.
 1988. The Philosophical Writings of Descartes in 3 vols. Cottingham, J., Stoothoff, R., Kenny, A., and Murdoch, D., trans. Cambridge University Press. This work is traditionally cited with the initials CSM (for Cottingham, Stoothoff, and Murdoch) or CSMK (for Cottingham, Stoothoff, Murdoch, and Kenny) followed by a volume number in Roman numeral; thus CSM II refers to volume 2 of this edition.
 1998. René Descartes: The World and Other Writings. Translated and edited by Stephen Gaukroger. Cambridge University Press. (This consists mainly of scientific writings, on physics, biology, astronomy, optics, etc., which were very influential in the 17th and 18th centuries, but which are routinely omitted or much abridged in modern collections of Descartes' philosophical works.)

Translation of single works

 1628. Regulae ad directionem ingenii. Rules for the Direction of the Natural Intelligence. A Bilingual Edition of the Cartesian Treatise on Method , ed. & trans. G. Heffernan (Amsterdam/Atlanta: Rodopi, 1998).
 1633. The World, or Treatise on Light , tr. by Michael S. Mahoney.
 1633. Treatise of Man, tr. by T. S. Hall. Cambridge, MA: Harvard University Press, 1972.
 1637. Discourse on the Method, Optics, Geometry and Meteorology, trans. P. J. Olscamp, Revised edition (Indianapolis: Hackett, 2001).
 1637. The Geometry of René Descartes , trans. D. E. Smith & Marcia Latham (Chicago: Open Court, 1925).
 1641. Meditations on First Philosophy, tr. by J. Cottingham, Cambridge: Cambridge University Press, 1996. Latin original. Alternative English title: Metaphysical Meditations. Includes six Objections and Replies. A second edition published the following year, includes an additional Objection and Reply and a Letter to Dinet. HTML Online Latin-French-English Edition .
 1644. Principles of Philosophy , trans. V. R. Miller & R. P. Miller: (Dordrecht/Boston/London: Kluwer Academic Publishers, 1982).
 1648. Descartes' Conversation with Burman, tr. by J. Cottingham, Oxford: Clarendon Press, 1989.
 1649. Passions of the Soul , trans. S. H. Voss (Indianapolis: Hackett, 1989). Dedicated to Elisabeth of the Palatinate.
 1619–1648. René Descartes, Isaac Beeckman, Marin Mersenne. Lettere 1619–1648, ed. by Giulia Beglioioso and Jean Robert-Armogathe, Milano, Bompiani, 2015 pp. 1696.

See also 

 3587 Descartes, asteroid
 Cartesian circle
 Cartesian doubt
 Cartesian materialism (not a view that was held by or formulated by Descartes)
 Descartes number
 Cartesian plane
 Descartes Prize
 Descartes-Huygens Prize
 Cartesian product
 Cartesian product of graphs
 Cartesian theater
 Cartesian tree
 Descartes crater and Highlands on the Moon (Apollo 16 landing site)
 Descartes' rule of signs
 Descartes's theorem (4 tangent circles)
 Descartes' theorem on total angular defect
 Folium of Descartes
 Bucket argument
 Paris Descartes University
 List of things named after René Descartes

Notes

References

Citations

Sources 

 
 
 
 ; (2009) Third Edition, edited with a new introduction by James McGilvray, Cambridge University Press, .
 
 
  
  
 
 
 Farrell, John. "Demons of Descartes and Hobbes." Paranoia and Modernity: Cervantes to Rousseau (Cornell UP, 2006), chapter 7.
 
 
 
 Gillespie, A. (2006). Descartes' Demon: A Dialogical Analysis of 'Meditations on First Philosophy.' Theory & Psychology, 16, 761–781.
 
 
 Heidegger, Martin [1938] (2002) The Age of the World Picture in Off the Beaten Track  pp. 57–85
 
 
 Monnoyeur, Françoise (November 2017), Matière et espace dans le système cartésien, Paris, Harmattan, 266 pages. .
 Moreno Romo, Juan Carlos, Vindicación del cartesianismo radical, Anthropos, Barcelona, 2010.
 Moreno Romo, Juan Carlos (Coord.), Descartes vivo. Ejercicios de hermenéutica cartesiana, Anthropos, Barcelona, 2007.
 
 Negri, Antonio (2007) The Political Descartes, Verso.
 
 Sasaki Chikara (2003). Descartes' Mathematical Thought . (Boston Studies in the Philosophy of Science, 237.) xiv + 496 pp., bibl., indexes. Dordrecht/Boston/London: Kluwer Academic Publishers.
 
 Serfati, Michel, 2005, "Géometrie" in Ivor Grattan-Guinness, ed., Landmark Writings in Western Mathematics. Elsevier: 1–22.
 
 
 
 Watson, Richard A. (2007). Cogito, Ergo Sum: a life of René Descartes. David R Godine. 2002, reprint 2007. . Was chosen by the New York Public library as one of "25 Books to Remember from 2002"

External links

General
 The Correspondence of René Descartes in EMLO
 
 
 
 Detailed biography of Descartes at MacTutor
 
 John Cottingham translation of Meditations and Objections and Replies.
 René Descartes (1596–1650) Published in Encyclopedia of Rhetoric and Composition (1996)
 A site containing Descartes' main works, including correspondence, slightly modified for easier reading
 Descartes Philosophical Writings tr. by Norman Kemp Smith at archive.org
 Studies in the Cartesian philosophy (1902) by Norman Kemp Smith at archive.org
 The Philosophical Works Of Descartes Volume II (1934) at archive.org
 Descartes featured on the 100 French Franc banknote from 1942.
 
 
 Centro Interdipartimentale di Studi su Descartes e il Seicento
 Livre Premier, La Géométrie, online and analyzed by A. Warusfel, BibNum[click "à télécharger" for English analysis]

Bibliographies
 Bibliografia cartesiana/Bibliographie cartésienne on-line (1997–2012)

Stanford Encyclopedia of Philosophy
 Descartes
 Life and works
 Epistemology
 Mathematics
 Physics
 Ethics
 Modal Metaphysics
 Ontological Argument
 Theory of Ideas
 Pineal Gland
 Law Thesis

Internet Encyclopedia of Philosophy
 Descartes
 Descartes: Ethics
 Descartes: Mind-Body Distinction
 Descartes: Scientific Method

Other
 Bernard Williams interviewed about Descartes on Men of ideas
 BALDASSARRI, F. (2019) The mechanical life of plants: Descartes on botany. The British Journal for the History of Science, 52(1), 41-63. doi:10.1017/S000708741800095X

 

1596 births
1650 deaths
17th-century French mathematicians
17th-century French philosophers
17th-century French scientists
17th-century French writers
17th-century Latin-language writers
17th-century male writers
Age of Enlightenment
Aphorists
Augustinian philosophers
Burials at Saint-Germain-des-Prés (abbey)
Catholic philosophers
French consciousness researchers and theorists
Constructed language creators
Critics of animal rights
Deaths from pneumonia in Sweden
Enlightenment philosophers
Epistemologists
French emigrants to the Dutch Republic
French ethicists
French expatriates in Sweden
French expatriates in the Dutch Republic
French logicians
French mercenaries
French music theorists
French Roman Catholics
Leiden University alumni
Metaphilosophers
Metaphysics writers
Military personnel of the Thirty Years' War
Natural philosophers
Ontologists
People from Indre-et-Loire
People of the Age of Enlightenment
Philosophers of art
Philosophers of culture
Philosophers of education
Philosophers of history
Philosophers of logic
Philosophers of mathematics
Philosophers of mind
Philosophers of psychology
Philosophers of science
Philosophers of social science
Philosophers of time
Rationalists
Social philosophers
University of Poitiers alumni
Writers about activism and social change
Writers about religion and science
Writers who illustrated their own writing